USNS John Lewis (T-AO-205) is a United States Navy replenishment oiler and the lead ship of  her class. She is part of the Military Sealift Command fleet of support ships.

Ray Mabus, then Secretary of the Navy, announced on 6 January 2016 that the ship would be named in honor of John Lewis. Lewis was a civil rights leader and a United States representative from 1987 to 2020.

Construction
Construction was authorized for the first six ships in the class on 30 June 2016. The contract price for John Lewis in 2016 was US$640,206,756. National Steel and Shipbuilding Company began construction of John Lewis on 20 September 2018, with completion scheduled for November 2020. 

The John Lewis-class will be equipped with a basic self-defense capability, including crew served weapons, degaussing, and AN/SLQ-25 Nixie torpedo decoys, and has space, weight, and power reserves for Close-In Weapon Systems (CIWS) such as SeaRAMs.

She was christened on 17 July 2021, the first anniversary of Lewis's death. After completing sea trials with the Navy's Board of Inspection and Survey, John Lewis entered non-commissioned U.S. Navy service under the control of the Military Sealift Command on 27 July 2022.

Rescue of stranded sailor
A  sailboat had suffered damage with torn sails and had been drifting for 5 days. Once the sailor was located, he was checked by the medical crew, then fed and clothed. The sailor was then transported to San Diego, where he did not require hospitalization.

See also
  - predecessor class

References

External links

 
 
  

Tankers of the United States Navy
John Lewis-class oilers
Proposed ships of the United States Navy
2021 ships
Ships built in San Diego